Ladle may refer to:
 Ladle (spoon), a bowl-shaped serving device for liquids such as soup, in Hausa language called Ludayi
 Ladle (metallurgy), a vessel used to carry, and pour molten metal
 Ladle, a monthly tournament of Armagetron Advanced